A nullo or smoothie is a member of a body modification subculture made up mostly of men who have had their genitals (and sometimes also their nipples) surgically removed. Nullos are not necessarily transgender; most identify as eunuchs.  The term nullo is short for genital nullification. Though the procedure is mostly sought by men, there are women who also voluntarily have their vagina stitched closed and clitoris, nipples and breasts removed.

One of the most famous nullos is Mao Sugiyama, a Japanese artist and asexual activist who in 2012 had his genitals surgically removed, cooked, and served to paying guests at a public banquet. Sugiyama, who uses the nickname "Ham Cybele", also had his nipples removed.

See also
Skoptic syndrome
Skoptsy
Mutilation
Neutrois
Body integrity dysphoria

References

Body modification
Castration
Third gender